Vithe is a village in akole Tahshil of Ahmednagar district in Maharashtra state of India.
Vithe is the village on the bank of Pravara river. Vithe is also rich with natural resources. The forest in village is very much famous for variety of wild life. Peacock, Tiger, Lizard, Monkey and many more type of animals and birds are main attraction of forests in Vithe. These forests is under control of Government of Maharashtra.

Primary Health Center (Government Hospital) 
In Vithe the Government of Maharashtra has provided on Primary Health Center (i.e. Government Hospital) with latest equipment required. This Hospital is life line of patients of rural area. All near by villages like Chintalwedhe, Nimbral, Thakarwadi, Chinchmali, Bhojdari, Nirgudwadi, Ambad, Rumbhodi take benefits of this hospital.

HBP Savitra-aai Vidyalaya 
In Vithe HBP Savitra-aai Vidyalaya is main source of education for Students of secondary school. This high school starts from 8th to 10th Standard. All near by villages like Chintalwedhe, Nimbral, Thakarwadi Chinchmali, Bhojdari and Nirgudewadi take benefits of this High school.

How to Reach in Vithe
In the north of Vithe, nearest village is “Nimbral”, In south “Padalane”, In In east “Rumbhodi” and “Aambad” and in West “Chintalwedhe”.
Vithe is 13 km from Akole and 7 km from Rajur. The State highway Kolhar-Ghoti passes through village. MSRTC buses are available from both Akole and Rajur to reach in Vithe.

Vithe : Places of Attraction

Chohandi Waterfall

Vithe is rich with its beauty of Nature and Natural resources. One of the natures gift in Vithe is waterfall present in the mountain of Sahyadri. This waterfall is locally known as “Chohandi”. Which is main attraction of visitors. All the visitors across Ahmednagar District when come to visit bhandardara their first stop is this waterfall in Monsoon season. This waterfall flow only during rainy season(i.e. In Monsoon).

Pravara River
After crossing all hurdles of Sahyadri Mountain and walls of two dams(i.e. Bhandardara and Nilwande Dam) finally Pravara River start flowing and the first village in the route is Vithe. God has gifted this beautiful river to Vithe with clean water flow. All the people form this village is depend on Pravara River river for water.

Villages in Ahmednagar district